Ḥasan ʿAlā Zikrihi's-Salām (Persian/) or Hassan II was the hereditary Imam of the Nizari Isma'ilis of the Alamut Period from 1162 until 1166. From his capital of Alamut he ruled parts of Persia and Syria. His chief subordinate in Syria was Rashid ad-Din Sinan, the Old Man of the Mountain.

Biography

In 1164 Hassan, leading the Nizari sect of Ismaili Islam, proclaimed the Qiyamat, the abrogation of Sharia law. The concept of Qiyamah in exoteric Islam means the End of the World and the Day of Judgment. But in the esoteric interpretations of Ismaili Islam, Qiyamah is the beginning of an era of spiritual renaissance where the spiritual dimensions of Islam will be practiced openly, spiritual truths will become widely known, and certain ritualistic aspects of Islam will be abrogated. Fatimid Ismaili texts from the 10th-11th century describe the anticipated arrival of the Qiyamah era by a future Fatimid Ismaili Imam. These expectations were fulfilled by the declaration of Qiyamah by Imam Hasan.

Declaration of the Qiyama

Only two years after his accession, the Imām Hasan ‘Alā Zikrihi's Salām  conducted a ceremony known as qiyama (resurrection) at the grounds of the Alamut Castle, whereby the Imām would once again become visible to his community of followers in and outside of the Nizārī Ismā'īlī state. Given Juwayni's polemical aims, and the fact that he burned the Ismā'īlī libraries which may have offered much more reliable testimony about the history, scholars have been dubious about his narrative but are forced to rely on it given the absence of alternative sources.  Fortunately, descriptions of this event are also preserved in Rashid al-Din’s narrative and recounted in the Haft Bab Baba-yi Sayyidna, written 60 years after the event, and the later Haft Bab-i Abi Ishaq, an Ismaili book of the 15th century AD. However, Rashid al-Din's narrative is based on Juwayni, and the Nizari sources do not go into specific details. Since very few contemporary Nizari Ismaili accounts of the events has survived, and it is likely that scholars will never know the exact details of this event. However, there was no total abrogation of all law - only certain exoteric rituals like the Salah/Namaz, Fasting in Ramadan, Hajj to Makkah and facing Makkah in prayer were abrogated; however the Nizaris continued to perform rituals of worship, except these rituals were more esoteric and spiritually oriented.  For example, the true prayer is to remember God at every moment; the true fasting is to keep all of the body's organs away from whatever is unethical and forbidden. Ethical conduct is enjoined at all times.

Death
The Imām Hasan died a violent death in 1166, only a year and a half after the declaration of the qiyama. According to Juwayni, he was stabbed in the Ismaili castle of Lambsar by his brother-in-law, Hasan Namwar. He was succeeded by his son Imām Nūr al-Dīn Muhammad, who refined and explained Hasan's doctrine of qiyamah in greater detail.

See also

Alamut Castle
Order of Assassins
Ata al-Mulk Juvayni
Tarīkh-i Jahān-gushā 
Crusades
History of Nizari Ismailism

References

External links
Hassan II at the Encyclopædia Iranica
HASAN ALA ZIKRIHI'S SALAM (557-561/1162-1166)
The Qā’im and Qiyāma Doctrines in the Thought of Fāṭimid and Alamūt Ismāʿīlism, the Evolution of a Doctrine

Nizari imams
People from Alamut
Iranian Ismailis
1166 deaths
Year of birth missing
People of the Nizari–Seljuk wars
12th-century Ismailis
12th-century Islamic religious leaders